WEC 40: Torres vs. Mizugaki was a mixed martial arts event held by World Extreme Cagefighting on April 5, 2009 at the UIC Pavilion in Chicago, Illinois. The event aired live on the Versus Network.

Background
This was the first WEC event to exclusively feature fights in the lightweight, featherweight, and bantamweight weight classes. The organization's heavier weight classes had been folded into the UFC over the previous four months. World Extreme Cagefighting would maintain this weight class structure for the remainder of the promotion's existence.

WEC Bantamweight Champion Miguel Torres was to defend his title against Brian Bowles at this event, but Bowles was forced to withdraw from the bout due to a back injury, and was replaced by WEC newcomer Takeya Mizugaki. The Torres/Bowles bout was rescheduled for WEC 42 that August, where Bowles won the title by knockout.

Early reports suggested that Wagnney Fabiano could face former WEC Featherweight Champion Urijah Faber at this event, though he was later confirmed to be facing Fredson Paixao instead.

Anthony Pettis was scheduled to make his WEC debut at this event against Anthony Njokuani, but was forced from the card with a broken hand and was replaced by Bart Palaszewski.

Cole Province was originally slated to face Rafael Dias at this event, but bowed out due to an injury and was replaced by Mike Budnik.

A featherweight bout between Cub Swanson and Diego Nunes was once scheduled for this card, but was cancelled after Nunes suffered a hand injury three days prior to the event.

The event drew an estimated 470,000 viewers on Versus.

Results

Bonus Awards
Fighters were awarded $10,000 bonuses.

Fight of the Night:  Miguel Torres vs.  Takeya Mizugaki
Knockout of the Night:  Anthony Njokuani
Submission of the Night:  Rani Yahya

See also
 World Extreme Cagefighting
 List of World Extreme Cagefighting champions
 List of WEC events
 2009 in WEC

External links
Official WEC website

References

World Extreme Cagefighting events
2009 in mixed martial arts
Mixed martial arts in Chicago
Sports competitions in Chicago
2009 in sports in Illinois
Events in Chicago